Thelionema caespitosum, the tufted lily or tufted blue-lily, is a species of perennial herb, native to Australia. The lily-like flowers are blue, light blue, pale yellow or white and have yellow stamens.

The species occurs in  the Northern Territory, South Australia, Tasmania, Victoria, New South Wales and Queensland.

It was first described by botanist Robert Brown in 1810 in Prodromus Florae Novae Hollandiae, and given the name Stypandra caespitosa. The species was transferred to a new genus, Thelionema, in 1985.

See also

 List of plants known as lily

References

Asparagales of Australia
Flora of South Australia
Flora of Queensland
Flora of New South Wales
Flora of the Northern Territory
Hemerocallidoideae
Flora of Victoria (Australia)
Plants described in 1810